Czerwieniec may refer to the following places in Poland:
Czerwieniec, Lower Silesian Voivodeship (south-west Poland)
Czerwieniec, Pomeranian Voivodeship (north Poland)